Mucci may refer to:

 Albano Mucci (born 1968), Australian activist
 Antonio Mucci (1932–2004), Argentine politician
 Celeste Mucci (1999),  Australian athlete
 Cristina Mucci (born 1949), Argentine writer and journalist
 Domenick Mucci Jr. (born 1956), Ohio politician
 Henry Mucci (1909–1997), United States Army Rangers colonel
 Lou Mucci (1909–2000), American jazz trumpeter
 Mara Mucci (born 1982), Italian politician

See also
 Dion DiMucci (born 1939)